The 1966 RAC Tourist Trophy saw the world’s oldest motor race, organised by the Royal Automobile Club, return to Oulton Park on 29 April, for the 31st running of the RAC International Tourist Trophy Race sponsored by Daily Express. The TT, was the second round of the British Sports Car Championship.

Report

Entry
Despite the race being dropped from the World Sportscar Championship, the event still attracted a total of 30 sports cars, across two classes. However, just 21 took part in qualifying.

Qualifying
Dick Protheroe lost his life at the wheel of a Ferrari 330P-64 following an accident during a practice session.

Race
The race was held over 140 laps of the circuit, split into two heats of 70 laps. Second place went to Tony Dean, in his Brabham-Climax BT8. The podium was completed by Peter Sutcliffe, in his Ford GT40. As Sutcliffe was also the Group 6 class winner, he was awarded The Oulton Trophy. For Hulme, this victory was his second Tourist Trophy, he would go on and win a further two, the last being in 1986.

Classification

Aggregate Results

 Fastest lap: Denny Hulme, 1:37.400secs. (102.646 mph)

References

RAC Tourist Trophy
RAC Tourist Trophy
RAC Tourist Trophy